Greg Fitzgerald (born 1 September 1978) is an Irish actor, who appeared in a number of films in the 1990s including War of the Buttons (1994), The Butcher Boy (1998), and One Man's Hero, (1999). Fitzgerald's theatre appearances include a lead role in Gary Mitchell's 1999 play Trust.

Filmography
War of the Buttons (1994)
A Soldier's Song (short 1997)
The Butcher Boy (1997)
EastEnders (TV series 1997)
Le frère Irlandais (TV movie 1999)
One Man's Hero (1999)

References

External links
 

Irish male stage actors
Irish male child actors
1978 births
Living people
Irish male film actors